The 1956–57 Czechoslovak Extraliga season was the 14th season of the Czechoslovak Extraliga, the top level of ice hockey in Czechoslovakia. 14 teams participated in the league, and Ruda Hvezda Brno won the championship.

Regular season

1. Liga-Qualification

External links
History of Czechoslovak ice hockey

Czech
Czechoslovak Extraliga seasons
1956 in Czechoslovak sport
1957 in Czechoslovak sport